Leo Haid  (July 15, 1849 – July 24, 1924) was an American Benedictine abbot and Catholic bishop, who served as the abbot of the Abbey of Mary Help of Christians, in Belmont, North Carolina, from 1885 to 1924.  He also served as vicar apostolic of North Carolina from 1888 to 1910 and territorial abbot from 1910 to 1924.

Biography

Early life 
Michael Haid was born on July 15, 1849, near Latrobe, Pennsylvania, to German immigrants John and Mary A. Stader Haid. He studied at Saint Vincent Seminary in Latrobe and there became a novice of the Benedictine Archabbey of Saint Vincent in 1868. He made first profession as a monk on September 17, 1869. He adopted the first name of Leo.

Haid was ordained a priest by bishop Michael Domenec for the Benedictine Order on December 21, 1872. He then served the monastery college as a professor and chaplain.On July 13, 1885, Haid was elected as first abbot of Mary Help of Christians Abbey (known as Belmont Abbey) in Belmont, North Carolina. Travelling there in 1886, he founded a seminary at the abbey.

Vicar Apostolic of North Carolina 
On February 4, 1888, Pope Leo XIII appointed Haid as apostolic vicar of North Carolina; he was consecrated bishop at the Baltimore Cathedral by Archbishop Cardinal James Gibbons on July 1, 1888, The co-Consecrators were Bishops John Kain and Thomas Becker. Haid became the  first American abbot-bishop. 

Haid served as president of the American Cassinese Congregation from 1890-1902 and was a prominent authority on monastic life in the United States.  He helped establish and supervise Benedictine College Preparatory in Richmond, Virginia, Savannah Priory in Savannah, Georgia and St Leo Universityin St. Leo, Florida.On August 27, 1899, Haid dedicated St. Nicholas' Catholic Church in Zanesville, Ohio, as Bishop John Ambrose Watterson, bishop of Columbus, had died the previous year. In 1909, Haid laid the cornerstone of the St. Mary Catholic Church in Wilmington, North Carolina.

Territorial Abbot of Belmont 
On June 8, 1910 Pope Pius X erected Belmont Abbey as a territorial abbey and appointed Haid abbot nullius with canonical jurisdiction over eight counties in North Carolina (Gaston, Catawba, Cleveland, Burke, Lincoln, McDowell, Polk, and Rutherford).

Leo Haid died at Belmont Abbey on July 24, 1924, at age 75, and was buried in the abbey cemetery.

References

Territorial Abbey of Belmont-Mary Help of Christians on Catholic-Hierarchy.org
Anthony D. Andreassi "Leo Michael Haid" in Michael Glazier and Thomas J. Shelley (eds.) The Encyclopedia of American Catholic History The Liturgical Press: Collegeville, Minnesota 1997.
Paschal Baumstein My Lord of Belmont: A Biography of Leo Haid Belmont, NC 1985.

1849 births
1924 deaths
People from Latrobe, Pennsylvania
American people of German descent
American Benedictines
American abbots
Belmont Abbey College people
20th-century American Roman Catholic titular bishops
People from Belmont, North Carolina
Religious leaders from North Carolina
Catholics from Pennsylvania
Catholics from North Carolina